Mauricio Ochmann (born November 16, 1977) is an American-born, Mexican actor best known for his roles in telenovelas, such as Amarte Asi, where he starred as Ignacio "Nacho" Reyes. He also appeared in Kevin Costner's film Message in a Bottle, the TV series That's life and Latino Green.  He appeared as Fabián Duque in Telemundo's Dame Chocolate. He starred as Victorino Mora in Telemundo's hit Victorinos and was the leading role in the Telemundo novela El Clon. He is also the star of "El Chema" a spin off of his character "Chema Venegas" from the hit television series "El Señor de los Cielos".

Early life 
Mauricio Ochmann was born on November 16, 1977, in Washington, D.C. Ochmann never knew his biological parents and during his first years of life grew up with his adoptive mother, María, and her first husband, Guillermo, who finally divorced. After the separation, Mauricio and his mother moved to Mexico, where the actor's mother began a relationship with German Thomas Ochmann and lived with his brothers Thomas, Christian and Paulo. Years later Mauricio moved to Los Angeles, where he studied acting in Joanne Baron Studio of Santa Monica.

Career

Early career (1997–2005) 
From a young age, Mauricio showed interest in the performance by participating in various local activities and works, but it was at age 16 that he got his first professional opportunity on the TV show La Otra Cosa by Héctor Suárez. After studying in Los Angeles he got a small role in the movie Message in a Bottle, alongside actors like Kevin Costner and Robin Wright. After his first works, he returned to Mexico where actor and producer Humberto Zurita and his wife Cristian Bach give him the opportunity to star in his first telenovela with Bárbara Mori, titled Azul Tequila, which premiered in 1998. The following year he is chosen by Elisa Salinas to star in the telenovela Háblame de amor with Danna García. After entering in the television, decides to act in works of theaters and its first putting in scene was in "Equus" with which it obtains to several recognitions, among them the prize to "Actor Revelation in Theater" by the National Association of Theater Critics. In 2000 he returned to Los Angeles and participated in the series produced by Diane Ruggiero, entitled That's Life. At the end of this one returned to Mexico to act along to Lorena Rojas in the telenovela Como en el cine (2001), for Televisión Azteca. In 2003, he participated in the telenovela Mirada de mujer, el regreso, sequel of Mirada de mujer. Also he was part of the cast of productions like Ladies' Night, in 2004 on 7 mujeres, 1 homosexual y Carlos, along to Adriana Fonseca, Rogelio Guerra, Luis Felipe Tovar and Ninel Conde. In 2005 he appeared in the thriller film, Ver, oír y callar, along to Luis Felipe Tovar and Paola Núñez. Also, with Litzy he protagonized the telenovela Amarte así, Frijolito, in the character of "Ignacio"; and in the film Tres, by Carlos Valdivia.

Critical success in telenovelas and films (2006–present) 

Among his works are the telenovelas Dame chocolate and Marina which he abandoned because of addiction problems. In 2007 he participated in Victoria, in which he shared credits with Géraldine Bazán and Andrea López, among other artists; the melodrama was a remake of Señora Isabel and Mirada de mujer (1997), starring Angelica Aragón and Ari Telch. Between 2010 and 2011 i starred in the telenovelas Victorinos, remake of Cuando quiero llorar no lloro and that in turn is based on the book written by the Venezuelan author Miguel Otero Silva and El sexo débil along to Itatí Cantoral. Already in 2012, he stars in her last telenovela titled Rosa diamante, along with Carla Hernández, then the following year he entered the Telemundo series, El Señor de los Cielos, where he only appeared in the final episode of the first season, in the second and third season was promoted to main protagonist. Thanks to this series he was nominated several times in the annual awards of Telemundo. But it was at the 2015 ceremony where he won the "Best Bad Boy" award. After concluding his participation in the series, Mauricio began to dedicate himself to the cinema and to participate in publicity campaigns.

In 2015 he premiered his film A la mala; this would be his first project with the woman he would marry in 2016, Aislinn Derbez.  Also, in 2016 he appeared in the American series Easy; later he returned to play Jose María "Chema" Venegas, in the series El Chema, spin-off of the series El Señor de los Cielos. Thanks to this character Mauricio has managed to be recognized in several parts of the world, receiving positive critics as well as negative, given a personage supposedly based on El Chapo.

More recently, the company had signed a first-look deal at Pantaya.

Personal life 

Ochmann has disclosed that he started consuming alcohol during childhood and his use increased with age, making him to consider suicide in 2006.

Ochmann has been married twice. His first marriage was to María José del Valle Prieto. They had a daughter named Lorenza in 2004, and divorced in 2008. His second marriage was to Aislinn Derbez, daughter of Eugenio Derbez. They met in 2014 while filming 'A la Mala', and married in 2016. They had a daughter named Kailani, born in 2018, and divorced in June 2020.

He has mostly recently been romantically linked to model Paulina Burrola on his social media.

Filmography

Stage 
 El Graduado (Mexican production of The Graduate, 2004)
 Equus (2000) as Alan
 Sueños de Juventud as Carlos
 Profanación
 Medicos a Palos as Bartolome
 La dama del alba
 El juicio as Judge
 ''Veintidós, Veintidós

See also 
Lorena Rojas

References

External links 

1977 births
Living people
Mexican male film actors
Mexican male stage actors
Mexican male telenovela actors
Mexican male television actors
American male film actors
American male stage actors
American male telenovela actors
American male television actors
People from Celaya
Male actors from Guanajuato
People educated at Centro de Estudios y Formación Actoral